Manavathi is a 1952 Indian film produced in two language editions, Telugu & Tamil. The film was directed by Y. V. Rao. The film stars Mukkamala and Madhuri Devi.

Cast
List adapted from the database of Film News Anandan and from iMDB.(see external links)

Male cast
Mukkamala
C. H. Narayana Rao
Relangi
Mani

Female cast
Madhuri Devi
P. K. Saraswathi
G. Varalakshmi
Sriranjani Jr.

Production
The film was produced in Telugu and Tamil under the banner Sarvodaya Films and was directed by Y. V. Rao. Chidambaram A. M. Nataraja Kavi wrote the Tamil dialogues.

Soundtrack
Music was composed by H. R. Padmanabha Sastry and B. Rajanikanta Rao

Tamil
Lyrics were penned by Chidambaram A. M. Nataraja Kavi. Playback singers are Vidwan Srinivasan, R. Vijaya Rao, P. Leela, R. Balasaraswathi Devi, Jikki, A. P. Komala, T. G. Saraswathi, Seetha, Anusuya and S. Rajam.

References

External links

1950s Telugu-language films
Indian multilingual films
Indian black-and-white films
1952 films
1950s Tamil-language films
Indian musical drama films
1950s musical drama films
Films directed by Y. V. Rao
Films scored by Balantrapu Rajanikanta Rao
Films scored by H. R. Padmanabha Sastry